

Article summary

In this Harvard Business Press article, the co-authors of the Blue Ocean Strategy book, W. Chan Kim and Renée Mauborgne explain the importance of alignment across the three strategy propositions of value, profit and people propositions, regardless of an executive's strategic approach to strategy. This article builds on the concept of value innovation, the concept of being able to increase value while reducing costs at the same time. This article was referenced by Paul E. Kmen in his paper on how companies can break the trade-off between improving the sustainability in their offerings versus the higher costs associated with becoming a truly social responsible company. The paper illustrates how becoming environmental-friendly can actually lower the production costs by reducing the inputs used. By not taking the structure of the operating environment as a given, a company may generate additional revenues from better products and create new businesses by taking a reconstructionist approach to strategy.

Whether an organization takes the structuralist or the reconstructionist approach to strategy, the set of value proposition, profit proposition and people proposition must be aligned in order to produce high-performing results in the long run. According to Kim and Mauborgne, a structuralist approach is one where strategy is developed to exploit the industrial and economic environment in which an organization operates. In other words, in a traditional competitive (structuralist) strategic approach, the structure of the industry is assumed to remain unchanged and the strategy of an organization is to exploit the industrial and economic conditions within the industry to achieve growth and profits by either pursuing a differentiated position or a low cost position. Anything in between is considered "stuck in the middle". In this strategic approach, the value, profit and people propositions have to be aligned with the distinctive choice of pursuing either differentiation or low cost, each being an alternative strategic position in an industry. Under a blue ocean (reconstructionist) approach, where strategy is developed to reconstruct the industrial and economic environment in which an organization operates, the three strategy propositions must be aligned to pursue both differentiation and low cost. The article warns against the misalignment of the three strategy propositions through the case of Napster where the failure to create a strong people proposition for its business partners, the major recording labels at the time, cost Napster the opportunity to develop a viable profit proposition despite a highly differentiated value proposition. By contrast, iTunes created a powerful blue ocean strategic move by aligning across the value, profit and people propositions, thus making this Apple Inc. offering hard to imitate even to this day.

The three strategy propositions
The article discusses how the three strategy propositions correspond to the traditional activity system of an organization: the outputs of an organization's activities are value for the buyer and revenue for itself, and the inputs are the costs to produce them and the people to deliver them. By applying the four actions framework of eliminate, reduce, raise and create, one is able to reconstruct an existing industry offering to pursue differentiation (raise and create new key factors of unprecedented value) while lowering costs (reduce and eliminate key factors that are overdesigned or causing buyers to refuse your offering). The three strategy propositions are defined as follows:

 Value proposition – the utility buyers (referring to both customers and noncustomers) receive from an offering minus the price they pay for it
 Profit proposition – the revenues an organization generates from an offering minus the cost to produce and deliver it
 People proposition – the positive motivations and incentives put in place for people needed to support and implement the strategy

In the main body of the article, each of these strategy propositions is explored further by using the city of Dubai: how its value proposition was compelling to foreign investors, allowing Dubai to develop new and lucrative ways to make money so as to build a differentiated profit proposition at low cost compared with other oil-based Arab economies, and, finally, to offer a powerful people proposition that is motivating to its citizens despite the onslaught of foreigners in this small Arab emirate.

References

External links
 INSEAD Knowledge website 
 Blue Ocean Strategy website 
 Harvard Business Review article in brief 

Strategic management